P116 may refer to:
 , a patrol boat of the Mexican Navy
 Boulton Paul P.116, a British trainer aircraft
 Papyrus 116, a biblical manuscript
 , a patrol boat of the Turkish Navy
 P116, a state regional road in Latvia